Black rat snake may refer to:

Pantherophis alleghaniensis, the eastern ratsnake
 Pantherophis spiloides, the central ratsnake
Pantherophis obsoletus, the western ratsnake